Cold Prey 3 is a 2010 Norwegian slasher film, it is the prequel to the highly successful Cold Prey (Fritt vilt), and Cold Prey 2 (Fritt vilt II). It is directed by Mikkel Brænne Sandemose and starred Nils Johnson in the leading role.

Plot

A group of young friends take a trip into Jotunheimen National Park. They plan on hiking into the area where an abandoned hotel sits in the mountains; it was the site of several disappearances including a young boy who vanished into thin air. After opting to camp in the woods instead of staying at the old hotel, the friends soon discover there is a hulking killer amongst the woods, and he may not be alone. Flashbacks show the killer's childhood and youth in the 1970s.

Cast

Production

Cold Prey 3 is set to be a prequel to the first two films. It was completely shot in Jotunheimen, Norway.

Release

The film premiered on 15 October 2010 in Norway.

Reception

Cold Prey 3 was received negatively; only 16% of audience members sampled by Rotten Tomatoes reacted positively. Scott Weinberg of ChillerTV was critical of the third installment of the Cold Prey series, saying, "The good will of the solid original and its amusing sequel has been squandered by laziness."

References

External links

2010 films
2010 horror films
2010s slasher films
2010s Norwegian-language films
Norwegian slasher films
Films set in 1990
Norwegian horror films
Films set in the 1980s
Films set in Norway
Films shot in Norway
2010s serial killer films